Turut may refer to:
İsmail Türüt (b. 1965), Turkish folk singer
Mehmet Türüt (b. 1945), Turkish wrestler
Turut, Iran (disambiguation)